Fruit pit carving (Chinese: 核雕; pinyin: hédiāo) is a Chinese folk handicraft in which the pits of peach, apricot, walnut, Chinese olive, yumberry and other drupes are used to create minute patterns of the Buddha, nature, or the Chinese zodiac that are said to repel evil spirits. The carved pits are also used to create jewelry and decorations. However, the art is now facing extinction because few black olive trees are planted in China and there are very few people interested in learning this art.  Olive core carving has recently been recognized as an Intangible Cultural Heritage of the Guangdong Province of China.

History
Fruit pit carving began in the Spring and Autumn Period (BC. 770- BC. 476), and the earliest example of the art dates from the Song Dynasty (960-1279), roughly 1000 years ago. However, it did not become popular until the Ming Dynasty (1368-1644). At that time, even the emperor owned master carvings used as aristocratic decoration. Fruit pit carving became even more popular in the Qing Dynasty (1644-1911), but after the First and Second Opium Wars its popularity began to decline.

Famous Craftsmen and Works

Wang Shuyuan
Wang Shuyuan, a Ming Dynasty craftsman from what is now Changshu, Jiangsu Province, created one of the art's masterpieces, a three-centimeter-long peach pit boat in Chibi, Hubei Province, at nighttime. The minute detail of the carved pit includes four working windowpanes, five human figures, flower patterns, and poems. The piece is remembered in "Nut Carving Boat," a literary passage included in some Chinese middle school textbooks.

Chen Zihe
Lived in Weifang, Shandong Province during the Qing dynasty.

Chen Zuzhang
Chen is a court artist in the Qing Dynasty, best known for Boat Carved from an Olive Stone. Today, the work is part of the collection of National Palace Museum

Du Langui
Lived from 1881 to 1960 in Weifang, Shandong Province.

Ding Huaizeng
Lived from 1878 to 1940 in Weifang, Shandong Province. Was commemorated for one of his carvings at the Panama–Pacific International Exposition in 1915.

Li Chen 
Li is an artist from Anshan village of Tumen city, Jilin province, China. Li carves peach pits.

See also
 Phytelephas palm seed works made by craftsmen in Ecuador

References

Chinese folk art